Pregnanolone, also known as tetrahydroprogesterone (THP), may refer to:

 Allopregnanolone (3α-hydroxy-5α-pregnan-20-one or 3α,5α-tetrahydroprogesterone)
 Pregnanolone (3α-hydroxy-5β-pregnan-20-one or 3α,5β-tetrahydroprogesterone)
 Isopregnanolone (3β-hydoxy-5α-pregnan-20-one or 3β,5α-tetrahydroprogesterone)
 Epipregnanolone (3β-hydoxy-5β-pregnan-20-one or 3β,5β-tetrahydroprogesterone)

See also
 Progesterone
 Pregnanedione
 Pregnanediol
 Pregnanetriol
 Dihydroprogesterone
 Hydroxyprogesterone

References

Pregnanes